Conus venezuelanus is a species of sea snail, a marine gastropod mollusk in the family Conidae, the cone snails and their allies.

Like all species within the genus Conus, these snails are predatory and venomous. They are capable of "stinging" humans, therefore live ones should be handled carefully or not at all.

Description 
Original description: "Shell elongated, tapered, with sharp-angled shoulder; spire elevated, concave along sides; body whorl heavily sculptured with numerous fine spiral threads and sulci; spire whorls sculptured with 3 spiral cords; color white to pale salmon-pink, with 2 bands of dark yellow maculations around mid-body; spire marked with scattered small, brown, crescent-shaped flammules; interior of aperture white; periostracum thin, smooth, translucent yellow."

The maximum recorded shell length is 27 mm.

Distribution
Locus typicus: "Off Puerto Cabello, 
Golfo de Triste, Venezuela."

This species occurs in the Caribbean Sea
off Venezuela.

Habitat 
Minimum recorded depth is 25 m. Maximum recorded depth is 25 m.

References

 Petuch, E.J. (1987) New Caribbean Molluscan Faunas. The Coastal Education and Research Foundation, Charlottesville, Virginia, 154 pp.
 Tucker J.K. & Tenorio M.J. (2009) Systematic classification of Recent and fossil conoidean gastropods. Hackenheim: Conchbooks. 296 pp.
 Puillandre N., Duda T.F., Meyer C., Olivera B.M. & Bouchet P. (2015). One, four or 100 genera? A new classification of the cone snails. Journal of Molluscan Studies. 81: 1–23

External links
 The Conus Biodiversity website
 Cone Shells – Knights of the Sea
 

venezuelanus
Gastropods described in 1987